The Buffalo–Niagara Falls Metropolitan Statistical Area is a metropolitan area, designated by the United States Census Bureau, encompassing two counties — Erie and Niagara in Western New York. It has a population of almost 1.2 million people. It is the second-largest metropolitan area in the state of New York, centering on the urbanized area of Buffalo.

As of April 1, 2020, the metropolitan statistical area (MSA) had a population of 1,166,902; the combined statistical area (CSA), which adds Cattaraugus, had a population of 1,215,826 inhabitants. It is part of the Great Lakes Megalopolis, which contains an estimated 54 million people. The larger Buffalo Niagara Region is an economic zone consisting of eight counties in Western New York.

In 2010, the Buffalo – Niagara Falls metropolitan statistical area was ranked the 10th best place in the U.S. for working mothers by ForbesWoman magazine.

Counties
Erie
Niagara
Cattaraugus (part of CSA)

Communities

Cities
Buffalo
Lackawanna 
Lockport 
Niagara Falls 
North Tonawanda
Olean (part of CSA)
Salamanca (part of CSA)
Tonawanda

Towns

Villages

Census-designated places

Indian Reservations
Cattaraugus Reservation (partial)
Tonawanda Reservation (Erie County)
Tonawanda Reservation (Niagara County)
Tuscarora Reservation (Niagara County)

Demographics

As of the 2020 Census there were 1,166,902 people residing in the MSA. It was 74.5% White, 13.0% Black or African American, 0.7% American Indian or Alaska Native, 4.2% Asian, <0.1% Pacific Islander, 2.1% Other and 5.5% Two or More Races. 5.8% of the population identified as Hispanic or Latino.

Transportation

Amtrak stations

Major airports

Major highways
 Interstate 90
 Interstate 190
 Interstate 290
 Interstate 990
 U.S. Route 20
 U.S. Route 20A
 U.S. Route 62
 U.S. Route 219
 New York State Route 5
 New York State Route 18
 New York State Route 33
 New York State Route 104
 New York State Route 198
 New York State Route 400

Combined Statistical Area
The Buffalo–Cheektowaga–Cattaraugus Combined Statistical Area is made up of three counties in western New York. The statistical area includes one metropolitan area and one micropolitan area. As of the 2010 Census, the CSA had a population of 1,215,826.

Metropolitan Statistical Areas (MSAs)
Buffalo–Niagara Falls (Erie and Niagara counties)
Micropolitan Statistical Areas (μSAs)
Olean (Cattaraugus County)

See also
New York census statistical areas
Buffalo Niagara Region
Great Lakes region

References

 
Erie County, New York
Niagara County, New York
Metropolitan areas of New York (state)